Lifting may refer to:
Manual handling of loads
Raising objects upwards, for example with lifting equipment
Weightlifting, lifting weights for exercise and sport, including:
Olympic weightlifting, an Olympic sport that tests explosive strength
Powerlifting, a sport that tests limit strength
Weight training, a way of increasing strength
 An undesirable type of movement in the sport of racewalking
Shoplifting, an unnoticed theft of goods from an open retail establishment
 Facelifting, a type of cosmetic surgery
 Lift, a morphism in mathematics
 Lifting theory, a notion in measure theory
 Lifting scheme (wavelets)
 Lambda lifting, meta-process that defines functions independently of each other in a global scope
 Taking an inference rule in propositional logic and adapting it for predicate logic
 Type lifting, adding the special  value to the scope of a type

See also 
 Facelift (disambiguation)
 Lift (disambiguation)